Harry William D. Ransom (born 1 October 1999) is an English professional footballer who plays for Crawley Town, as a defender.

Career
Born in Uckfield, Ransom began his career with Eastbourne Borough in 2016. In March 2019 it was announced that he would transfer to Millwall in the summer transfer window. He spent time on loan at Dover Athletic, before moving to Crawley Town in June 2021. He returned on loan to Dover in September 2021.

References

1999 births
Living people
English footballers
Eastbourne Borough F.C. players
Millwall F.C. players
Dover Athletic F.C. players
Crawley Town F.C. players
National League (English football) players
English Football League players
Association football fullbacks